WXMY was a broadcast radio station licensed to Saltville, Virginia, serving the Saltville/Marion. WXMY was owned and operated by Continental Media Group, LLC.

Owner arrested
Smyth County, Virginia authorities arrested WXMY owner Jeff Raynor on Wednesday, July 18, 2007. Raynor was charged with one count of using electronic communication to solicit sexual activity with a child and one count of possession of child pornography.

On July 19, 2007, WXMY fell silent and the WXMY website was taken offline.

On Wednesday, July 25, 2007, WXMY came back on the air and was being run by Wendy Raynor. The station was then being listed as owned by Continental Media Group, LLC in the FCC database; previously it showed Jeffrey L. Raynor as owner.

According to the station's website (as of Sep 2, 2007), WXMY had fallen silent. Then in October 2007, WXMY returned to the airwaves with a Classic Country format.

FCC license issues
In February 2007, the station received permission for Pre Sunrise and Post Sunset operations, which allows a daytime-only AM station to operate at reduced power during the period shortly before sunrise and shortly after sunset when the FCC determines the station does not need to cease operations to protect other AM stations.

On April 30, 2007, Continental Media Group had applied with the FCC to increase power from 5 kW to 23 kW (Daytime) and 11 watts at night. That application is still pending as of December 30, 2007.

On June 27, 2018, Continental Media Group surrendered WXMY's license to the FCC. The FCC cancelled the station's license on July 2, 2018.

References

External links
FCC Station Search Details: DWXMY (Facility ID: 68182)
FCC History Cards for WXMY (covering  1975-1981 as WIAJ)

XMY
Radio stations established in 1981
1981 establishments in Virginia
XMY
Defunct radio stations in the United States
Radio stations disestablished in 2018
2018 disestablishments in Virginia
XMY